Mail Order Magic is the second solo album by singer Roger Chapman and his then band The Shortlist, released in 1980. The production of this album was somewhat troublesome and difficult, but in the end a convincing and powerful album was released.

Track listing

Side one

Side two

Personnel

 Roger Chapman  - Harmonica, Vocals
 Geoff Whitehorn - Guitar
 Tim Hinkley - Keyboards
 Poli Palmer — Synthesizer
 John Wetton — Bass
 Jerome Rimson — Bass, Vocals
 Les Binks — Drums
 Mitch Mitchell — Drums
 John Halsey — Drums

References

Roger Chapman albums
1980 albums